Anita Miller may refer to:

 Anita Miller (publisher) (1926–2018), American author and publisher
 Anita Miller (field hockey) (born 1951), American field hockey player and Olympic athlete
 Anita Miller Smith (1893–1968), American impressionist and regionalist painter